Malcolm Douglas Moss (born 6 March 1943) is a British politician of the Conservative Party who served as the Member of Parliament (MP) for North East Cambridgeshire from 1987 until his retirement at the 2010 general election.

Early life
Born in Audenshaw, Lancashire, he went to Audenshaw Grammar School on Stamford Road (now Audenshaw School) in Audenshaw (1954–1962), then the St John's College, Cambridge, receiving a BA in 1965 then a Certificate in Education in 1967, and an MA in 1969. He taught geography at Blundell's School in Tiverton (1966–1970), being Head of Geography and Economics from 1968 to 1970. From 1971 to 1974, he worked for Barwick Associates Ltd, being an insurance consultant from 1971 to 1972 in Worcestershire, then general manager from 1972 to 1974 in Wisbech. He founded Mandrake Associates Ltd (based in Wisbech) in 1974, being director until November 1994. The company was taken over by Hambro Countrywide in November 1986 since 1998, a Preston based company owned by Chesnara.

He served as a member of Wisbech Town Council from 1979 to 1983, being Mayor from 1982 to 1983. From 1983 to 1987, he was a member of the Fenland District Council, then from 1985 to 1988 of the Cambridgeshire County Council.

Parliamentary career
He was first elected in June 1987, beating the incumbent Liberal, Clement Freud. 

He was a junior minister under John Major in the Northern Ireland Office. From October 1997 to November 1999 he was the Shadow Minister for Northern Ireland before being appointed Shadow Minister for Agriculture until October 2001. He served as the Shadow Minister for the Local Government and the Regions until June 2002, and Transport until October 2002. From then until November 2006, he was the Shadow Minister for Culture and Media, until being succeeded by Ed Vaizey. From November 2006 to May 2010 he was a member of the Foreign Affairs Committee.

On 6 September 2007, Moss announced his intention to stand down at the next general election. He was succeeded by Steve Barclay at the May 2010 general election.

Personal life
He married Vivian Lorraine Peake on 28 December 1965, and they had two daughters. Lorraine died in 1997, and in May 2000 he married Sonya Alexandra McFarlin.

References

External links
 Malcolm Moss Official Website
 
 ePolitix.com - Malcolm Moss MP
 Guardian Unlimited Politics - Ask Aristotle: Malcolm Moss MP
 TheyWorkForYou.com - Malcolm Moss MP
 The Public Whip - Malcolm Moss MP voting record
 BBC News - Malcolm Moss MP  profile 10 February 2005

News items
 Claiming shires would be abolished in 2001
 Fenland MP Malcolm Moss will stand down from the Peterborough Evening Telegraph

1943 births
Living people
Alumni of St John's College, Cambridge
Conservative Party (UK) MPs for English constituencies
Members of Cambridgeshire County Council
UK MPs 1987–1992
UK MPs 1992–1997
UK MPs 1997–2001
UK MPs 2001–2005
UK MPs 2005–2010
People from Audenshaw
Northern Ireland Office junior ministers
20th-century British politicians
21st-century British politicians
People from Wisbech